Nick Everhart is an American film director and producer. He has worked as an intern for The Asylum, where he did various tasks that include line production, writing, and directing, and with the SyFy Channel, where he worked as a producer. Everhart is also an alumnus of the University of Missouri–Kansas City, where he graduated with a degree in 2006.

Filmography

References

External links
 
 

Living people
American television producers
American film producers
American film directors
Year of birth missing (living people)